Alejandro Abellan (born May 13, 1965, in Murcia, Spain) is a Canadian film and television actor.

The son of Spanish immigrants, his first role in the film industry was as Antonio Banderas's stand-in and photo double for the film The Thirteenth Warrior. Alejandro's first big acting role was as Tito in "Phenomenon", based on the John Travolta movie. Alejandro then appeared as Coach Quintero on the Nickelodeon show Romeo!. Alejandro has also been in a few featured films such as Gray Matters.

External links 

Canadian male film actors
Canadian male television actors
Living people
1965 births